The Trappeaceae are a family of truffle-like fungi in the order Hysterangiales. The family contains two genera and four species.

References

External links

Hysterangiales